Cavan was a constituency represented in the Irish House of Commons from 1611 to 1800.

Between 1725 and 1793 Catholics and those married to Catholics could not vote.

Borough
This constituency was the borough of Cavan in County Cavan.

History
It returned two members to the Parliament of Ireland from 1611 to 1800. In the Patriot Parliament of 1689 summoned by King James II, Cavan Borough was represented by two members. The borough was disenfranchised under the terms of the Acts of Union 1800. £15,000 in compensation was divided between Theophilus Clements and Thomas Nesbitt.

Members of Parliament, 1611–1801

Notes

References

Bibliography

Constituencies of the Parliament of Ireland (pre-1801)
Historic constituencies in County Cavan
1611 establishments in Ireland
1800 disestablishments in Ireland
Constituencies established in 1611
Constituencies disestablished in 1800